The Bahrain Centre for Human Rights (BCHR) was a Bahraini non-profit non-governmental organisation which works to promote human rights in Bahrain, which was founded by a number of Bahraini activists in June 2002. The centre was given a dissolution order after its former president Abdulhadi Al Khawaja was arrested in September 2004 a day after criticizing the country's Prime Minister, Khalifah ibn Sulman Al Khalifah at a seminar in which he blamed the Prime Minister for the failure of widespread economic development for all citizens. The BCHR is still banned by the government, but has remained very active.

In 2013 the organisation was awarded the Rafto Prize for its work.

History

Foundation 

In June 2002 the Bahrain Centre for Human Rights was founded by Abdulhadi Alkhawaja, Nabeel Rajab, Abdulaziz Abul, Ramla Jawad, Jawad Al-Asfoor, Jenan Al-Sheikh and others.

2004 dissolution 

On 25 September 2004 the BCHR was closed down and Alkhawaja was arrested a day after publicly criticizing the Prime Minister and the Bahraini regime for corruption and human rights abuses. In November 2005 a court sentenced AlKhawaja to one year in prison on charges which included "inciting hatred" and accusing authorities of corruption, under provisions prescribed by the 1976 Penal Code.

On the morning of 21 November, the court sentenced Alkhawaja to one year in prison, but later in the day it was announced that he had been given a Royal Pardon by the King and was released.

Although its license was revoked, the BCHR is still functioning after gaining wide internal and external support for its struggle to promote human rights in Bahrain. According to Human Rights Watch, as of 2011 "The government continues to deny legal status to the BCHR, which it ordered dissolved in 2004 after the group's then-president criticized the prime minister for corruption and human rights violations."

Vision and Mission 

BCHR describes its vision as "a prosperous democratic country free of discrimination and other violations of human rights" and says its mission is to "encourage and support individuals and groups to be proactive in the protection of their own and others' rights; and to struggle to promote democracy and human rights in accordance with international norms" based on four objectives:

Objectives 

 Promoting freedoms and basic rights (civil, political and economic)
 Combating racial discrimination
 Dissemination of human rights culture
 Contributing in providing support and protection for victims and the vulnerable

Structure and funding 

The 26-founding members includes prominent doctors, lawyers, journalists, and NGO leaders, men and women. Membership in the general assembly is open for volunteers who serve more than six months at one of the centre's committees. BCHR's general assembly elects its board of directors for a two-year term.

The current President is Nabeel Rajab, who is serving a two-year prison sentence. The Acting President is Maryam Al-Khawaja.

Activities 

Although a young organization, BCHR has carried out many projects, including advocacy, training, workshops, seminars, media campaigns and reporting to UN mechanisms and international NGOs. BCHR has also participated in many regional an international conferences and workshops.

The centre mainly works by campaigning on, and documenting / releasing reports on local issues including the targeting of human rights defenders or political activists targeting, the detention of Bahraini citizens, the detention of more than 500 men - including six Bahrainis - at Guantanamo Bay detainment camp, migrant workers conditions and rights of migrant workers, restrictive local laws, torture and abuse of an unknown number of citizens during a period of local unrest in the 1990s (see: Torture in Bahrain and 1990s Uprising in Bahrain), and women's rights.

Defamation campaigns, threats and harassment 

Members of BCHR have been the subject of ongoing harassment including physical attacks and smear campaigns in the media.

Abdulhadi Alkhawaja 

On 19 September 2007, Alkhawaja was the principal target of a defamation campaign by the Bahraini Authorities aimed at discrediting the BCHR. He was accused of being connected with acts of violence in Bahrain during the 1980s and 1990s, of sympathizing with Iran and of coordinating with neo-conservatives in the United States. (The Bahraini authorities have a history of defaming activists who report on or publicly criticize high-ranking officials and official policies, particularly when western media and international human rights organizations are involved. Allegations are published in the national public media to which activists are refused access to defend themselves.)

On 9 February 2010, Alkhawaja was removed from a Turkish Airlines flight at Bahrain International Airport as he was about to leave for Istanbul to attend a human rights conference. Following a subsequent alleged altercation with an airport official he was arrested and charged with "insulting" the official. Front Line believes that Alkhawaja has been targeted solely as a result of his legitimate work in the defence of human rights.

Since 10 March 2011, messages have been circulated via SMS and social networking sites calling for Alkhawaja and other activists to be killed because of their involvement in explicitly peaceful protests calling for democratic and human rights reforms in Bahrain.

Nabeel Rajab 

Since 2005, Nabeel Rajab has been the subject of ongoing harassment including physical attacks and smear campaigns in the media (official TV, radio channels, Bahrain news agency and newspapers close to government). In a postal campaign targeting Rajab and his wife thousands of letters were distributed accusing him and his wife of being traitors and including his photo.  Thousands of telephone text messages were sent to people in Bahrain via a company in South Africa that was paid through the private account of Sheikh Ahmed bin Ateyatalla Al-Khalifa, former Minister of state. The complaints filed by Rajab and his wife filed with the Office of the Public Prosecutor were ignored and never investigated.

On 15 July 2005, Rajab was beaten by Special Forces whilst attending a peaceful demonstration in solidarity with the Committee for the Unemployed. He suffered a spinal injury, a broken finger, a fractured arm and a head injury and was hospitalised for two weeks as a result (see pictures). He continues to suffer the consequences of the spinal injury.

In March 2007, Rajab was interrogated by the Office of the Public Prosecutor in relation to an article published by BCHR about the 'Bandargate Scandal', a government plan to marginalize the majority Shia community in Bahrain.

In 2007 the organisation Front Line (International Foundation for the Protection of Human Rights Defenders) which campaigns to protect human rights defenders at risk who work, non-violently, for the rights enshrined in the Universal Declaration of Human Rights, expressed deep concern that ongoing intimidation and harassment was intended to discourage Rajab from carrying out legitimate peaceful activities in defence of human rights in Bahrain, citing in particular the rights of freedom of expression and opinion, freedom of assembly and freedom of association.

In August 2009, Rajab was arrested for a few hours after attending a peaceful sit-in in front of the Saudi Arabian embassy in solidarity with Al-Murbati family one of whose family members has been imprisoned in Saudi Arabia for 7 years without trial.

In September 2010 Rajab's photograph was published a number of times by the government-owned Alwatan Newspaper which accused him of supporting an alleged terrorism network and being "active in publishing false reports and information". On 4 September 2010, the Bahrain National News Agency (BNA) published a statement coming from the national security services which referred to Rajab as having been officially accused of involvement in the alleged terrorist network and posted his picture at the agency website. The following day the agency removed Mr. Rajab's name and photo from the statement.

During this time, the authorities imposed a ban preventing Rajab from engaging in any new business in Bahrain that made it difficult for him to earn a living. The ban was subsequently lifted without any justification having been given for it.

When the security crackdown in mid August 2010 started many human rights defenders were arrested.  An order for Nabeel Rajab's arrest was issued on 8 September 2010 but was cancelled on 18 October 2010. Nabeel was the subject of a travel ban between September 2010 to October 2010.

On 2 December 2010, Nabeel Rajab was detained by national security police for an hour at Manama airport as he was about to fly to Greece. He was subjected to selective security measures, threatened and his personal laptop and mobile phone were confiscated (along with the other electronic devices in his possession).  All the files and other information on these devices were copied, including family pictures and files related to Rajab's human rights work.

Rajab's phone and electronic communication are closely monitored, as the questioning of current detainees about their relationship and work with Rajab has revealed.

In December 2010 Human Rights Watch commented that although Bahrain's leaders repeatedly insisted that the Bahraini government respected human rights, its harassment of Nabeel Rajab told another story.

Maryam Alkhawaja 

Maryam Alkhawaja is the Head of the Foreign Relations Office for the BCHR. She spends much of her time in London, Europe and the USA promoting human rights. The Observatory reported that "reliable sources" told it about an anonymous defamatory campaign launched in early May 2011 against Nabeel Rajab and Maryam Alkhawaja, with the "active and passive support" of the Bahraini authorities.

Yousif al-Mahafdha 
 سيد يوسف المحافظة 
Yousif al-Mahafdha is a member of the board of directors at BCHR who participated in the 12 March 2011 march on the royal palace. Eight days later, his family reported that a group of 25 plainclothes police officers had come to his home at night and searched it, though al-Mahafda himself had been absent. His family was reportedly told that if al-Mahafda did not come to the police station voluntarily, the police officers would return "every night" until he did. BCHR also alleged that security forces were working to block al-Mahafdha's travels. On 5 December 2011, al-Mahafdha, Rajab, and Mohammed Al-Maskati of the Bahrain Youth Society for Human Rights were named in a death threat by Adel Flaifel, a former State Securities Services official, causing the International Federation for Human Rights and World Organisation Against Torture to call for an international letter-writing campaign on their behalf. On 6 January 2012, a stun grenade thrown by security forces injured al-Mahafda's arm during a protest.

On 25 January 2012, al-Mahafdha participated in an open seminar organised by Al Wefaq, Bahrain's main opposition party where he criticized the government on freedom of press, suppression of peaceful protests, blocking opposition websites and delaying visits of international human rights organizations.

Relationship with other human rights groups 

According to US embassy cables released by WikiLeaks the US ambassador to Bahrain, Adam Ereli, in 2010 noted that human rights organisations including Freedom House and Human Rights Watch relied too much on Rajab and the BCHR for their information on Bahrain. In January 2010, after Freedom House classified Bahrain as "not free" in its 2010 global survey of political rights and civil liberties, Ereli stated that the BCHR "likely had undue influence over the Freedom House researchers, who may not have cast a very wide net during their in-country consultations".

Partners 

BCHR is a partner with the following human rights organizations:
 International Federation of Human Rights (fidh)
 International Freedom of Expression Exchange (ifex)
 The Coalition for Organ Failure Solutions
 CARAM Asia

See also
 Human rights in Bahrain
 History of Bahrain
 Torture in Bahrain

References

External links
 Bahrain Centre for Human Rights website
 Gulf News: Civil societies threaten to boycott forum on reforms in Manama, 10/11/2005
 Human Rights Watch: Investigate Police Beatings; Attack Follows Decrees Closing Political Society, Independent Rights Centre, 22 July 2005
 Amnesty International: Use of force against demonstrators, 18 July 2005
 Amnesty International: Amnesty International welcomes the release of Abdul Hadi al-Khawaja, 21 November 2004
 Amnesty International: Amnesty International concerned by latest human rights developments, 17 November 2004
 Human Rights Watch: Rights Center Closed as Crackdown Expands, 30 September 2004
 Human Rights Watch: Activist Jailed After Criticizing Prime Minister, 29 September 2004
 Amnesty International: Concern over the detention of human rights defender and closure of human rights centre, 28 September 2004

2002 establishments in Bahrain
Organizations established in 2002
2002 establishments in Asia
Organizations disestablished in 2004
2004 disestablishments in Asia
Human rights in Bahrain
Politics of Bahrain
Human rights organisations based in Bahrain